Saperda imitans is a species of beetle in the family Cerambycidae. It was described by Felt and Joutel in 1904. It is known from Canada and the United States.

References

imitans
Beetles described in 1904